Mylothris kiellandi is a butterfly in the family Pieridae. It is found in Tanzania (western Usambara). The habitat consists of montane evergreen forests.

References

Butterflies described in 1985
Pierini
Endemic fauna of Tanzania
Butterflies of Africa